Whaley Thorns is a former colliery village in the Bolsover district of Derbyshire, England, close to the Nottinghamshire border. It is in the civil parish of Scarcliffe.

The village takes its name from a dense wood, recorded on the first Ordnance Survey Maps. "Whaley" being Celtic for water/spring, referring to both the local springs, just to the north, and the river Poulter which lies only  to the south. And "Thorn" an Anglo-Saxon word, for wood. So the original meaning, may have been either "Wood of the Springs", or "Wood above/between the water(s)".

In the Mid-nineteenth century, much of the wood was cut down, following the discovery of coal beneath it. Thanks to the nearby railway, the site soon grew into a colliery village. The village acquired both a fine Anglican Chapel, and a Methodist Chapel; both still hold regular services. It also acquired a large primary school, and later on in the 1940s, a fine Frank Lloyd Wright style school too.

In the late 1970s the chief employer, the colliery, closed. Since the colliery closures, the first school has closed and re-opened as a heritage centre, as well as re-education centre for ex-miners. The Second has remained open as a primary school.

Following the Pit (Colliery) closure, the villages' population has greatly reduced, due to the, lack of local employment, and the deprivation that happened as a result. Since 1990, many rows of terraced houses, have been demolished, due to their run-down, or in some cases derelict, nature.

There are now just two shops, and one pub.

External links

Villages in Derbyshire
Bolsover District